Bendyshe Layton (died 17 January 1918) was a British businessman and member of the Legislative Council of Hong Kong.

He was with the firm of Gibb, Livingston & Co., one of the leading trading firms in the East during the late nineteenth century. He later started his own business firm, Layton & Co., as a bill and bullion broker.

In 1888, he was nominated by the Hong Kong General Chamber of Commerce to sit temporarily in the Legislative Council during the absence of A. P. MacEwen.

He left Hong Kong in around 1913 or 1914 due to his health issue and lived in Britain until his death on 17 January 1918.

He had a son named G. B. Layton, who succeeded him as the head of the Layton & Co.

References

1918 deaths
British businesspeople
British expatriates in Hong Kong
Hong Kong businesspeople
Members of the Legislative Council of Hong Kong
Year of birth missing